Rafael Batyrshin (born August 26, 1986) is a Russian professional ice hockey defenseman who is currently under contract with Amur Khabarovsk in the Kontinental Hockey League (KHL). As a journeyman blueliner, Batyrshin has formerly played in the KHL with HC Vityaz, Atlant Moscow Oblast, HC Sibir Novosibirsk, Metallurg Magnitogorsk, Ak Bars Kazan and HC Sochi. He previously joined Magnitogorsk on May 7, 2014, agreeing to a two-year contract as a free agent. His brother, Ruslan, also played hockey.

Career statistics

Awards and honours

References

External links

1986 births
Living people
Ak Bars Kazan players
Amur Khabarovsk players
Atlant Moscow Oblast players
Avtomobilist Yekaterinburg players
Bars Kazan players
Krylya Sovetov Moscow players
Metallurg Magnitogorsk players
Russian ice hockey defencemen
HC Sibir Novosibirsk players
HC Sochi players
HC Vityaz players